Amalie Østergaard Vinther (born 24 December 1995) is a Danish Paralympic swimmer who competes in international level events.

Biography
Vinther is a double European champion and a four-time World bronze medalist in freestyle swimming. She has competed in the 2012 and 2016 Summer Paralympics and has qualified for the 2020 Summer Paralympics.

References

1995 births
Living people
People from Viborg Municipality
Sportspeople from Aarhus
Paralympic swimmers of Denmark
Danish female freestyle swimmers
Swimmers at the 2012 Summer Paralympics
Swimmers at the 2016 Summer Paralympics
Medalists at the World Para Swimming Championships
Medalists at the World Para Swimming European Championships
S8-classified Paralympic swimmers